UFC 74: Respect was a mixed martial arts pay-per-view event held by the Ultimate Fighting Championship on August 25, 2007, at the Mandalay Bay Events Center in Las Vegas, Nevada.

Background
The main event was a UFC Heavyweight Championship bout which featured champion Randy Couture defending his title against Gabriel Gonzaga, who knocked out Mirko Filipović at UFC 70 to become the number one contender.

Former UFC and TKO Major League MMA welterweight champion Georges St-Pierre, in his first fight since losing his title to Matt Serra at UFC 69, was matched up against The Ultimate Fighter's Josh Koscheck.

The card also featured former heavyweight champion Frank Mir against K-1 veteran Antoni Hardonk; The Ultimate Fighter 3's winner Kendall Grove; the UFC debut of PRIDE veteran Marcus Aurélio; The Ultimate Fighter 2 welterweight winner Joe Stevenson; and former light heavyweight challenger Renato Sobral.

Despite winning his bout, Sobral was fined $25,000 by the Nevada State Athletic Commission because he did not immediately follow referee's directions for releasing his chokehold after David Heath tapped. Due to the controversial manner in which the bout was stopped, Sobral was subsequently released from his UFC contract. 
Future UFC Heavyweight champion Brock Lesnar has said in an interview with ESPN that he wanted to fight in the UFC but Dana White wouldn't take his calls. He then said that he went to this event and after the show was over he jumped the barricade, avoided security, and introduced himself to White.

Results

Bonus awards

Fighters were awarded $40,000 bonuses.
Fight of the Night: Randy Couture vs. Gabriel Gonzaga
Knockout of the Night: Patrick Côté
Submission of the Night: Thales Leites

Reported payout
Randy Couture: $250,000
Gabriel Gonzaga: $45,000
Georges St-Pierre: $140,000 (includes $70,000 win bonus)
Josh Koscheck: $10,000
Roger Huerta: $34,000 (includes $17,000 win bonus)
Alberto Crane: $4,000
Joe Stevenson: $32,000 (includes $16,000 win bonus)
Kurt Pellegrino: $8,000
Patrick Coté: $24,000 (includes $12,000 win bonus)
Kendall Grove: $12,000
Renato Sobral: $25,000 ($25,000 win bonus withheld by NSAC)
David Heath: $6,000
Frank Mir: $66,000 (includes $30,000 win bonus)
Antoni Hardonk: $8,000
Thales Leites: $18,000 (includes $9,000 win bonus)
Ryan Jensen: $4,000
Clay Guida: $14,000 (includes $7,000 win bonus)
Marcus Aurélio: $30,000

External links
UFC 74 Event Site

See also
 Ultimate Fighting Championship
 List of UFC champions
 List of UFC events
 2007 in UFC

References

Ultimate Fighting Championship events
2007 in mixed martial arts
Mixed martial arts in Las Vegas
2007 in sports in Nevada